The following highways are numbered 141:

Canada
 Ontario Highway 141
 Prince Edward Island Route 141
 Quebec Route 141

Costa Rica
 National Route 141

India
 National Highway 141 (India)

Japan
 Japan National Route 141
 Fukuoka Prefectural Route 141
 Nara Prefectural Route 141

Malaysia
 Malaysia Federal Route 141

United States
 U.S. Route 141
 Alabama State Route 141
 Arkansas Highway 141
 California State Route 141 (former)
 Colorado State Highway 141
 Delaware Route 141
 Florida State Road 141 (former)
 County Road 141 (Hamilton County, Florida)
 County Road 141 (Madison County, Florida)
 Georgia State Route 141
 Illinois Route 141
 Indiana State Road 141 (former)
 Iowa Highway 141 
 K-141 (Kansas highway)
 Kentucky Route 141
 Louisiana Highway 141
 Maine State Route 141
 Massachusetts Route 141
 Missouri Route 141
 Montana Highway 141
 New Hampshire Route 141
 New York State Route 141
 County Route 141 (Erie County, New York)
 County Route 141 (Herkimer County, New York)
 County Route 141 (Niagara County, New York)
 County Route 141 (Rensselaer County, New York)
 County Route 141 (Sullivan County, New York)
 North Carolina Highway 141
 Ohio State Route 141
 Oklahoma State Highway 141
 Oregon Route 141
 Pennsylvania Route 141 (former)
 Tennessee State Route 141
 Texas State Highway 141
 Texas State Highway Loop 141 (former)
 Farm to Market Road 141
 Utah State Route 141
 Utah State Route 141 (1933-1969) (former)
 Vermont Route 141
 Virginia State Route 141
 Virginia State Route 141 (pre-1933) (former)
 Virginia State Route 141 (1923-1928) (former)
 Virginia State Route 141 (1933-1943) (former)
 Virginia State Route 141Y (former)
 Washington State Route 141
 Wisconsin Highway 141 (pre-1926) (former)

Territories
 Puerto Rico Highway 141